The men's 25 metre team small-bore rifle (originally called team competition with miniature-rifle) was a shooting sports event held as part of the shooting at the 1912 Summer Olympics programme. It was the first appearance of the event, though a mixed-distance team small-bore rifle event had been held in 1908. The competition was held on Friday, 5 July 1912.

Sixteen sport shooters from four nations competed.

Results

References

External links
 
 

Shooting at the 1912 Summer Olympics